Westel Willoughby Jr. (November 20, 1769 – October 3, 1844) was a physician and politician from New York. He served as a U.S. Representative from New York from 1815 to 1817.

Early life and education
Westel Willoughby Jr. was born on November 20, 1769, in Goshen, Connecticut. He studied medicine, received his license to practice, and moved to Newport, New York.

Despite already having been licensed to practice medicine since age 20, in 1812 Willoughby attended a course of medical lectures at Columbia University, and was awarded the honorary degree of Doctor of Medicine.

Career

Medical career
Willoughby served as president of the Herkimer County Medical Society from 1806 to 1816 and 1818 to 1836. He served as president of the College of Physicians and Surgeons now the State University of New York Upstate Medical University, from 1812 to 1844. He served as member of the medical staff of the New York Militia and was a veteran of the War of 1812.

Willoughby practiced in Herkimer County and was one of the founders of the College of Physicians and Surgeons in Fairfield, where he served as professor of obstetrics.

Political career
Willoughby served in the New York State Assembly in 1808 and 1809.In 1814 he ran for the United States House as a Democratic Republican, and appeared to be defeated by William S. Smith. Willoughby successfully contested the results and was seated for the remainder of the 14th United States Congress, December 13, 1815 to March 3, 1817. Willoughby was appointed judge of the court of common pleas of Herkimer County in 1805 and served until 1821.

Legacy
The town of Willoughby, Ohio was named for Dr. Willoughby, as was the Willoughby Medical College (now a part of The Ohio State University College of Medicine).

Willoughby died on October 3, 1844, in Newport, New York. He was interred in the First Baptist Church Cemetery.

References

External links

1769 births
1844 deaths
People from Goshen, Connecticut
People from Newport, New York
Columbia University Vagelos College of Physicians and Surgeons alumni
Members of the New York State Assembly
New York (state) state court judges
American militiamen
American militiamen in the War of 1812
Democratic-Republican Party members of the United States House of Representatives from New York (state)
Burials in New York (state)